Doddifoenus wallacei is a species of pteromalid wasp in the subfamily Leptofoeninae.

The species is diurnal.

References

Pteromalidae